Yegor Ivanovich Azovsky (born 10 January 1985) is a Kazakh former professional football player who played as a defender.

Azovsky has made a total of 21 appearances for Kazakhstan.

Personal life
His brother, Maksim, is also a professional footballer, currently for FC Zhetysu.

Career statistics

International

Statistics accurate as of match played 10 September 2008

References

External links

 

Living people
1981 births
Kazakhstani footballers
Association football defenders
Kazakhstan Premier League players
Kazakhstan international footballers
FC Zhenis Astana players
FC Ordabasy players
FC Atyrau players
FC Zhetysu players
FC Okzhetpes players
FC Kaisar players
FC Aktobe players